Alan Brian Christian Hansen (born 26 January 1972 in Frederiksberg, Denmark) is a Danish curler, a three-time  and three-time Danish men's champion.

He participated at the 2002 Winter Olympics where the Danish men's team finished in seventh place.

Teams

Men's

Mixed

References

External links

Living people
1972 births
Sportspeople from Frederiksberg
Curlers at the 2002 Winter Olympics
Olympic curlers of Denmark
Danish male curlers
Danish curling champions
20th-century Danish people